Frénouville is a commune in the Calvados department in the Normandy region in northwestern France. Frénouville-Cagny station has rail connections to Caen and Lisieux.

Population

See also
Communes of the Calvados department

References

Communes of Calvados (department)
Calvados communes articles needing translation from French Wikipedia